Severo Tiago (born 10 February 1903) was a Portuguese footballer who played as forward.

External links 
 Data at WorldFootball
 

1903 births
Portuguese footballers
Association football forwards
C.F. Os Belenenses players
Portugal international footballers
Year of death missing